The Columbia Theatre (1891 – c. 1957) or Loew's New Columbia Theatre in Boston, Massachusetts, was a playhouse and cinema located in the South End at No. 978 Washington Street. Charles Frohman, Isaac Baker Rich and William Harris ("Rich & Harris and Charles Frohman") oversaw the theatre until 1895. Owners included J.J. Grace of New York and Loews. Staff included Harry Farren, Saul Hamilburg and Philip Shea. The Columbia existed until its demolition in 1957.

Performances 
 1492 Up to Date, with Rice's "Surprise Party"
 Nat C. Goodwin, comedian
 Herbert Graham's "His Wedding Day"
 Brandon Thomas' Charley's Aunt
 Hagenbeck's trained animals
 Sydney Grundy's "Sowing the Wind"
 "The Belle of New York"

Notable people 
 Evelyn Campbell

Images

References

External links 

 Library of Congress. Columbia Theatre, Washington and Castle Streets, Boston, Massachusetts, illus. by Dumas

Theatres completed in 1891
1957 disestablishments in Massachusetts
Cultural history of Boston
20th century in Boston
1891 establishments in Massachusetts
Former theatres in Boston
Event venues established in 1891
Former cinemas in the United States
South End, Boston
Loew's Theatres buildings and structures
Demolished buildings and structures in Boston
Buildings and structures demolished in 1957